In Concert is a live double album by American jazz musician Miles Davis. It was recorded in 1972 at the Philharmonic Hall in New York City. Columbia Records' original release did not credit any personnel, recording date, or track listing, apart from the inner liner listing the two titles "Foot Fooler" and "Slickaphonics".

Critical reception 
In a contemporary review of the album, Bob Palmer of Rolling Stone magazine believed Carlos Garnett's saxophone playing sounded marginalized, but wrote that the music is "bracing, popping, at least one step ahead of the many Davis imitators. There are few real surprises, but there's a continuing skein of rhythms, themes and developments that makes fine extended listening." Robert Christgau wrote in Christgau's Record Guide: Rock Albums of the Seventies (1981) that although "it takes a while to get into gear" and is "pretty narrow in function", the album's "urban voodoo" has "more going for it rhythmically than On the Corner." In an article for The Village Voice, Christgau wrote of the album upon its reissue in 1997:

According to AllMusic editor Steve Huey, "melody isn't the point of this music; it's about power, rhythm, and the sum energy of the collective, and of Davis' electric jazz-rock albums, In Concert does one of the most mind-bending jobs of living up to those ideals". Erik Davis, writing in Spin magazine, praised its "rhythmic wall of sound" and said that its music is "of such propulsive psychedelic density that it makes the heaviest P-Funk sound like the Archies." JazzTimes writer Tom Terrell called Davis "a spiritual Hendrix with his own cosmic band of gypsies", and commented that the album's "visionary performance ... predicts hip hop ('Rated X's bassline = 'White Lines'), Ornette's Prime Time ('Black Satin') and Talking Heads ('Ife')".

In a mixed review, Don Heckman of the Los Angeles Times criticized Davis' use of the wah-wah effects controller and said that he was "not in particularly exceptional form" because he had "moved more deeply into pounding funk rhythms and fairly static sound textures." In The Rolling Stone Album Guide (2004), J. D. Considine felt that, although it was "occasionally fascinating, the busily churning rhythms often seem oddly static, as if the band were laboriously treading water."

Track listing

Original LP 
All tracks were composed by Miles Davis.

Record one - “Foot Fooler”

Record two - “Slickaphonics”

CD reissue

Personnel 
 Miles Davis – electric trumpet with wah-wah
Carlos Garnett - soprano and tenor saxophone
Cedric Lawson – electric piano, synthesizer
Reggie Lucas – electric guitar
Khalil Balakrishna – electric sitar
Michael Henderson – electric bass
Al Foster – drums
Badal Roy – tablas
James Mtume – percussion

References 

Footnote

Bibliography

External links 
 
 "Miles Davis - In Concert - On Second Thought" by Stylus Magazine

Albums produced by Teo Macero
Miles Davis live albums
1973 live albums
Columbia Records live albums